Sagalassa cryptopyrrhella is a species of moths in the family Brachodidae. It was described by Francis Walker in 1866. It is found in Brazil. They are nocturnal.

References

Brachodidae
Moths described in 1866